The Birmingham–Jefferson Convention Complex (formerly known as Birmingham–Jefferson Civic Center) is a sports, convention and entertainment complex located in Birmingham, Alabama. The Sheraton Birmingham and Westin Birmingham are located on the complex adjoining the convention center. Alongside numerous exhibit halls, meeting and ballrooms, the complex features four entertainment venues: a stadium, an arena, concert hall, and theater.

Design and architecture
The Birmingham–Jefferson Civic Center was designed by Geddes Brecher Qualls Cunningham, the winner of what was, at the time, the largest open architectural competition ever organized by the American Institute of Architects.  The original facility was built between 1974 and 1976 for approximately US$104 million. A.G. Gaston Construction Company, Inc. served as contractors.

A critical component of the competition program was making a viable connection across the elevated I-59/I-20 highway from the Civic Center facility to the existing administrative and cultural facilities surrounding Linn Park to the south. For several decades after the complex opened, this problem was not addressed. A proposal to create a park underneath the elevated highway was part of the expansion of the complex.

Multiple plans to expand the complex were presented before the final proposal was approved. An attempt by former Birmingham mayor Larry Langford to build a large domed stadium was unsuccessful. The BJCC authority purchased several parcels of land required for that expansion, but as of 2013, the project did not have major financial backing and lacked a clear design.  Former Birmingham Mayor William Bell expressed some interest in building a domed stadium, but on a smaller scale. The Alabama Department of Transportation began a project to replace the aging I-20/59 elevated viaduct adjacent to the complex, involving the reuse of some right-of-way to improve interstate ramps, which was expected to temporarily interfere with plans to build a multipurpose stadium at the complex's current site. In 2013, the new viaduct was expected to be completed and reopened to traffic by January 2020; work began in 2015 and on January 17, 2020, it was announced that the highway would reopen by January 21.

Venues

Arena

Legacy Arena (formerly known as the BJCC Coliseum until February 1999 and the BJCC Arena until December 2014), seats 17,654 for sporting events, 19,000 for concerts and 8,000 in a theater setting. It has been the home to ice hockey, college basketball and arena football teams in Birmingham.

It was home of the Birmingham Bulls of the WHA from 1976 to 1978 and another version of the Birmingham Bulls of the ECHL from 1992 to 2001. It was also home to the UAB men's basketball team starting in 1978 before the team moved into Bartow Arena in 1988. The Alabama Steeldogs, an af2 team, played in the arena from 2000 to 2007. 

Currently, it is the home of the Birmingham Squadron in the NBA G League.

In 2009 and 2017, the arena hosted Davis Cup tennis matches.

The arena has hosted major concert tours, Disney on Ice, American Idol Live!, the PBR Unleash the Beast Series, Monster Jam, Ringling Bros. and Barnum & Bailey Circus, and other events including trade shows.

In 2022, the arena will host the dancesport and gymnastics competitions for the 2022 World Games.

Stadium

Construction of a new football stadium, located just east of the main complex, began on July 25, 2019 with grading work. A ceremonial groundbreaking had been held on December 13, 2018. During construction, the venue was named Protective Stadium via a sponsorship deal with the Birmingham-based Protective Life insurance company. The 47,100-seat facility opened on October 2, 2021 as the new home of UAB Blazers football, with UAB's first game being a 36–12 loss to Liberty. It will serve as the site of the opening and closing ceremonies of the 2022 World Games, but cannot host any competitions due to World Games rules.

Concert hall
The 2,835 -seat BJCC Concert Hall was the home of the Alabama Symphony Orchestra before moving to UAB's state of the art Alys Stephens Center.  Concerts and touring Broadway and family shows are also held here.  It features an -by-88-foot (25.5-x-27-m) stage with a 24-foot-(7.3 m)-tall proscenium.  Its grid height of 105 feet (32 m) makes the concert hall the tallest building in the complex.  There is also a pipe organ at the Concert Hall, and backstage there are 2 chorus rooms and 12 dressing rooms, as well as two rehearsal areas and a VIP Reception Room.  The 2022 World Games powerlifting competitions will be held at the Concert Hall.

Theater
The 1,000-seat BJCC Theater is used for operas, ballets, and smaller concerts and stage shows, and is also home to the Birmingham Children's Theatre, the nation's largest children's theater.  The theater contains a 46-by-70-foot (14-by-21-meter) stage and a grid height of 58 feet (17.5 m).  There are 2 rehearsal areas, 2 chorus dressing rooms and 6 dressing rooms, including a star's dressing room.

Exhibition Hall
The  Exhibition Hall is used for Birmingham's largest trade shows and conventions.  It is divisible into three smaller halls and can accommodate 1100 exhibit booths.  During the 2022 World Games, the floorball and korfball competitions will be held in the East Exhibition Hall.  The North Exhibition Hall will host the bowling competition.

Other facilities
The complex contains 64 meeting rooms totaling  of meeting space, including a  ballroom that can seat up to 1,200 for banquets. The ten-story Medical Forum, with meeting space, a 275-seat theater, classrooms, conference space, and offices, is also located here. The adjacent 838-room Sheraton Birmingham Hotel provides a large ballroom and other convention and meeting facilities nearby. The Sheraton also housed the COGIC AIM Convention Youth Services in 2012. In 2022, billiards will be held at the Sheraton during the 2022 World Games. The 294-room Westin Birmingham Hotel within the Uptown entertainment district provides more than 7,000 square feet of flexible meeting space and an additional 2,500 square feet of pre-function space.

See also
List of concert halls
List of convention centers in the United States

References

External links
Adams, Les, editor (1969) Birmingham-Jefferson Civic Center National Architectural Competition. Birmingham, Alabama: Birmingham-Jefferson Civic Center Authority.
Geddes, Robert L. (1986) Principles and Precedents: Geddes Brecher Qualls Cunningham. Process Architecture No. 62. Tokyo: Books Nippan. 

1976 establishments in Alabama
Concert halls in the United States
Convention centers in Alabama
Event venues established in 1976
Sports venues in Birmingham, Alabama
Tourist attractions in Birmingham, Alabama